The 1960 San Francisco 49ers season was the franchise's 11th season in the National Football League and their 15th overall. The team was able to match their 7–5 output from the previous year. However, they again failed to make the playoffs. The season did have a silver lining, though, as the 49ers' defense was top-ranked in the league, allowing only 205 points.

The 49ers tied Detroit for second place in the Western Conference, a game behind the Green Bay Packers, but the Lions went to the inaugural third place Playoff Bowl in Miami in January. The teams had split their season series and the Lions won the tiebreaker based on points differential. The 49ers lost both games with Green Bay, the latter at home in the mud in December.

Schedule

Standings

References

External links
 1960 49ers on Pro Football Reference

San Francisco 49ers seasons
San Francisco 49ers
SAn Fran
San Fran 49